Keymar is an unincorporated community in Carroll County, Maryland, United States. The name of the community is a portmanteau of the family name Key (of which Francis Scott Key was a member) and Mar for Maryland. In 1822, Francis Scott Key sold his father's mansion and estate on Pipe Creek near this community. Keymar was likely the name of that estate.

References

Unincorporated communities in Carroll County, Maryland
Unincorporated communities in Maryland